The Stegall General Store is a historic commercial building on Arkansas Highway 66 in the center of Mountain View, Arkansas.  It is a single-story stone structure, set on the south side of the courthouse square, and has two plate glass windows flanking a central double-door entrance.  The store was built in 1926, during the city's second phase of stone construction in its center.

The building was listed on the National Register of Historic Places in 1985.

See also
National Register of Historic Places listings in Stone County, Arkansas

References

Commercial buildings on the National Register of Historic Places in Arkansas
Commercial buildings completed in 1926
Buildings and structures in Mountain View, Arkansas
National Register of Historic Places in Stone County, Arkansas
General stores in the United States